Joe Tryon-Shoyinka (born April 30, 1999) is an American football outside linebacker for the Tampa Bay Buccaneers of the National Football League (NFL). He played college football at Washington and was drafted by the Buccaneers in the first round of the 2021 NFL Draft.

Early life and high school
Tryon-Shoyinka grew up in Renton, Washington and attended Hazen High School, where he played baseball, basketball and football. As a senior, he was named regional defensive lineman of the year by The Seattle Times. Tryon-Shoyinka originally committed to play college football at Washington State but changed it to attend the University of Washington.

College career
Tryon-Shoyinka redshirted his true freshman season at the University of Washington. As a redshirt freshman, he played in 12 games with 20 tackles, two tackles for loss and one sack. Tryon-Shoyinka made 41 tackles with 12.5 tackles for loss and eight sacks in his redshirt sophomore season and was named second-team All-Pac-12 Conference. Following the Pac-12's original announcement that they would postpone the 2020 season due to the COVID-19 pandemic, Tryon-Shoyinka announced that he would prepare for the 2021 NFL Draft.

Professional career

Tryon-Shoyinka was selected in the first round (32nd overall) of the 2021 NFL Draft by the defending Super Bowl champion Tampa Bay Buccaneers. He signed his four-year rookie contract, worth $11 million, on June 22, 2021.

References

External links
Tampa Bay Buccaneers bio
Washington Huskies bio

1999 births
Living people
Players of American football from Washington (state)
Sportspeople from Renton, Washington
American football outside linebackers
American football defensive ends
Washington Huskies football players
Tampa Bay Buccaneers players